In enzymology, an arsenite-transporting ATPase is an enzyme that catalyzes the chemical reaction

ATP + H2O + arsenitein  ADP + phosphate + arseniteout

The 3 substrates of this enzyme are ATP, H2O, and arsenite, whereas its 3 products are ADP, phosphate, and arsenite.

This enzyme belongs to the family of hydrolases, specifically those acting on acid anhydrides acting on acid anhydrides to catalyse transmembrane movement of substances.  The systematic name of this enzyme class is ATP phosphohydrolase (arsenite-exporting).

Structural studies

See also 
 Arsenite-Antimonite efflux

References

 
 
 
 

EC 3.6.3
Enzymes of known structure